Kathleen Bell is an American physician, currently the Kimberly-Clark Distinguished Chair in Mobility Research.

A fictionalized version of Bell was featured on Saturday Night Live, where she was portrayed by comedienne Aidy Bryant.

References

Year of birth missing (living people)
Living people
University of Texas faculty
American rehabilitation physicians
University of Washington faculty